Hendrik Verhoeff (around 1645 – 27 June 1710, in Utrecht) was a silversmith and schutter from The Hague who played a role in the assassinations of Cornelis de Witt and Johan de Witt on 20 August 1672.

References
, De ware vrijheid: De levens van Johan en Cornelis de Witt, hoofdstuk 10-Ten onder, blz. 457-466, uitg. Atlas, 2005,  (In Dutch)

1640s births
1680s deaths
17th-century Dutch criminals
Dutch silversmiths
Criminals from The Hague